Tangeman may refer to:

 Tangemann, a surname
 Tangeman, Iran, a village in Iran